Oliver Chapoy is a musician/multi-instrumentalist/producer who resides in Brooklyn, New York.  Oliver is known for his work as a former co-writer/collaborator with Experimental Pop group Warm Ghost, the instrumental band Saxon Shore and his collaborations with the likes of Helado Negro, Sinkane (DFA Records), Mikael Jorgensen (Wilco), Leverage Models & more.  Oliver is also known for his performance in the group Shai Hulud. However he has been in other acts renowned for affecting the late 1990s Florida hardcore, and metalcore scene tremendously.  Oliver has also engineered records at Salad Days Studio for producer Brian McTernan, including records for Circa Survive and Bane.

Oliver is currently writing for his new solo electronic music project under the name, Certain Creatures, under which he has already remixed the likes of School of Seven Bells (Ghostly Int.), Bear In Heaven, Leverage Models and more.  Oliver recently collaborated with Stuart Argabright of Ike Yard (Factory Records/Acute Records) on the A-side of a 12" to be released by Brooklyn-based label Styles Upon Styles.

In August 2009, Oliver was one of 200 guitarists chosen to perform in the American premiere of Rhys Chatham's A Crimson Grail. Two hundred electric guitarists performed the piece at the Damrosch Park Bandshell in New York City and was commissioned by the Lincoln Center.

Bands
 Shai Hulud (1995–1998)
 The Rocking Horse Winner (2000–2001)
 Poulain (2002–2004)
 Saxon Shore (2004–Present)
 Aarktica Live Only (2006–2009)
 Helado Negro Live Band (2009–2010)
 Warm Ghost (2010–2012)
 Certain Creatures (2012–Present)

Discography

References

External links
Official website of Certain Creatures
Official website of Saxon Shore

Living people
Guitarists from Florida
American rock guitarists
Shai Hulud members
Year of birth missing (living people)
The Rocking Horse Winner members